Sarah Taillebois (born 17 September 1990) is a French politician who was Member of Parliament for Val-de-Marne's 9th constituency for a day in 2020.
Taillebois was the substitute candidate for Luc Carvounas in the 2017 election for Val-de-Marne's 9th constituency.  Carvounas was re-elected Mayor of Alfortville in 2020, which made him ineligible due to the changed cumulation of mandates rule. Tallebois held the constituency for a day, but was ineligible due to appointment to the École nationale d'administration.  A by-election was thus held in September 2020, which was won by Isabelle Santiago.

References

See also 

 List of deputies of the 16th National Assembly of France

1990 births
Living people
Socialist Party (France) politicians
Women mayors of places in France
Deputies of the 15th National Assembly of the French Fifth Republic
21st-century French women politicians
21st-century French politicians
Women members of the National Assembly (France)
People from Vitry-sur-Seine